Sir William David Wiggin (born 4 June 1966) is a British Conservative Party politician, and a former Shadow Minister for Agriculture & Fisheries. He has been the Member of Parliament (MP) for North Herefordshire, previously Leominster, since the 2001 general election.

Early life
Wiggin was born in London in 1966. He attended Eton College, where he was an older contemporary of David Cameron, and later read Economics at the Bangor University, gaining a Bachelor of Arts (Hons) in 1988. He also served in the Royal Welch Fusiliers in the TA, being a platoon commander for Holyhead, Bangor and Caernarfon.

Following this, Wiggin worked as a Trader in Foreign Exchange Options for UBS from 1991 to 1993, then was an Associate Director of Kleinwort Benson from 1994 to 1998, then as a manager in the Foreign Exchange department of Commerzbank from 1998.

Political career
Wiggin was selected as the official Conservative Party candidate for Burnley at the 1997 general election. He finished in second place behind Peter Pike of the Labour Party, who defeated him with a majority of 17,062 votes. He was selected as the Conservative Party candidate for the Conservative safe seat of Leominster in April 1999, replacing Peter Temple-Morris, who had defected to the Labour Party. He was elected in 2001 with a majority of 10,367 votes over his Liberal Democrat opponent.

Initially a backbencher, he became a member of the Environment, Food and Rural Affairs select committee in 2002. During 2003, Michael Howard appointed him to the position of Shadow Minister for Environment, Food and Rural Affairs and  Shadow Secretary of State for Wales. During his time Shadow Secretary of State for Wales the Conservatives won three seats in Wales at the 2005 general election, the first time Conservatives had been elected as MPs for Wales since the party had lost all its MPs in Wales at the 1997 election. Wiggin welcomed the gains, saying that "Never again will Wales be a Conservative-free zone", although he admitted that while the wins were "a good start" he would have liked the Conservatives to have gained more Welsh seats. Wiggin also expressed regret at Howard's decision to stand down as Conservative Leader after the election, adding that he thought Howard had "done a tremendous job" and was  "a fantastic example to young Conservative MPs like myself".

In January 2009, Wiggin became a whip.

He was re-elected at the 2005 general election with a 2.4% swing in his favour. In the reshuffle following the election, he was moved to Shadow Minister of Agriculture & Fisheries, where he remained until the 2010 general election.

Wiggin has voted against a blanket ban on smoking in pubs and restaurants, the 2004 Hunting Bill which outlawed fox hunting, and some sections of the Prevention of Terrorism bills.

During parish council elections in Leominster during September 2009, Wiggin complained to the returning officer about the leaflets of a candidate who was standing to protest at Wiggin's parliamentary expenses. The candidate, Jim Miller, was disqualified by the returning officer, who was also the chief executive of the Conservative-run Herefordshire County Council. This left the Conservative candidate unopposed. According to The Telegraph, Miller was disqualified over a technicality that the council previously told him had been resolved. The Mayor of Leominster expressed his astonishment at Wiggin's intervention.  "I was just stunned that Wiggin contacted the returning officer,"  "It's not totally blatant, but what in god's name is an MP doing poking his nose into a little parish election? I can't understand what he thinks he's up to."

Wiggin was re-elected at the 2010 general election for the new constituency of North Herefordshire with a reduced majority, after Parliament had accepted the Boundary Commission's Fifth Periodic Review of Westminster constituencies which slightly altered his former Leominster constituency to exclude those areas of the former county of Hereford and Worcester which are now in Worcestershire.

In June 2013, Wiggin spoke in debate in favour of the badger cull, saying he supported the Government policy to "combat" bovine tuburculosis.

In May 2015, Wiggin was re-elected once again increasing his vote share by 3.9% and more than doubling his majority from 9,887 to 19,996 votes.

Following the election, Wiggin was initially set to contest the Chairmanship of the Environment, Food & Rural Affairs Select Committee against eventual chair Neil Parish MP. Instead Wiggin was subsequently appointed as Chair of the Committee of Selection. As Chair of this Select Committee, Wiggin will also sit on the Liaison Committee which takes evidence from the Prime Minister and did so on four occasions during the 2014/15 Parliamentary session.

He is a member of the European Research Group and signed a letter to Prime Minister Theresa May on 16 February 2018 regarding Brexit negotiations.

Wiggin has described the trend away from eating meat as "a disaster for British agriculture." He has also advised MPs "not to be fooled" by arguments against chlorinated chicken.

In December 2019, Wiggin held his Conservative seat of North Herefordshire with 63% of the vote and a majority of 24,856.

He was knighted in the 2022 New Year Honours for political and public service.

In March 2022, Wiggin questioned Boris Johnson over his immigration record in the liaison committee and called on the prime minister to stop letting refugees ‘in rubber boats’ into the country ahead of Ukrainians and Qataris.

Local campaigns
Within his constituency, Wiggin successfully campaigned for improved broadband to rural areas, and helped to secure funding for a new swimming pool.

Wiggin has also campaigned for improved flood defences in Herefordshire, and frequently raises the issue in the House of Commons.

In 2007, he took Environment Secretary Hilary Benn on a tour including some of the areas affected by the summer 2007 floods, and in 2009 he took representatives from the Environment Agency on a series of visits to some of the villages and towns worst affected.

In 2014, Wiggin met with Dafydd Evans, Environment Agency Area Manager for the West Midlands, to press for action to enhance local flood defences.

One of Wiggin's longest-standing campaigns has been the improvement of rail services in North Herefordshire. He has helped to secure disabled access at Leominster Station and in 2012 he held a consultation on the new Rail Franchise at Ledbury Station. He regularly petitions the Government for improved services in North Herefordshire and in 2014 he contributed to the Great Western Franchise consultation with his constituents' views.

Agricultural Accidents Bill

Wiggin has also campaigned for better recording of agricultural accidents, namely those involving cattle. In April 2014, he presented a 10 Minute Rule Bill in Parliament to require the Health and Safety Executive to record certain details of such accidents and to report these details annually.

Following Wiggin's meeting with Rick Brunt, Head of Agriculture at the HSE, Minister Mike Penning MP announced that the HSE would start to collect and publish the data. This included TB testing, presence of a dog, breed of cattle and the proper circumstances and ages of cattle, details of those injured; whether a right of way was involved, whether the person was trespassing, and any other relevant and useful information.

Hereford County Hospital beds campaign

Wiggin renewed his call for more beds at Hereford County Hospital following a visit in September 2014, during which he toured one of the Canadian hutted units.

In December 2014, Wiggin questioned the Prime Minister during PMQs about Hereford County Hospital and sought his support for increasing the hospital's capacity. Following Wiggin's PMQ, the Prime Minister informed Wiggin he would send a Minister to look at the Hospital and in February 2015 Health Secretary Jeremy Hunt paid a visit.

In June 2015, Wiggin welcomed the contract awarded to Kier Group to deliver a programme of reconfiguration at Hereford County Hospital for the Wye Valley NHS Trust. The planned work includes increasing capacity at the hospital and replacing the 75-year-old 'Canadian Huts' currently used as inpatient wards and relocating both the endoscopy and day surgery facilities.

Expenses claims

During the parliamentary expenses scandal the Daily Telegraph reported that Wiggin had wrongly claimed more than £11,000 mortgage payments on his Herefordshire property. This property had no mortgage and Wiggin who had made 23 declarations that it was his main home said the expenses were claimed in error. The Committee found that Wiggin's mortgage claims were the result of "an unfortunate and unintended muddle" which should have been picked up much more quickly, though no cost to the public purse resulted because Wiggin was entitled to claim for the mortgage payments on his London home. The committee expressed disappointment that Wiggin had not been cooperative with the enquiry as required by the Code of Conduct.

His claims for household bills were also investigated following a complaint by Mr Miller. Wiggin had routinely claimed £240 a month for household bills and whilst the Standards and Privileges Committee confirmed that he could claim up to £250 a month without a receipt, this was to cover costs actually incurred.

Wiggin "chose not to" take up the committee's invitation to check his expenses with his bank and service providers and, on balance of probability they found he overclaimed expenses for council tax, telephone and workmen's bills.

In October 2010, Wiggin apologised to the House and was ordered to repay £4,009 utility expenses.

Register of Members' Interests

Until 10 October 2017, Wiggin was a non-executive director of Philip T English International Financial Services Ltd in Banbury, Oxforshire. The position came with remuneration of £5,000 a year with him spending approximately 60 hours a year on the job.

He was appointed non-executive director of Allpay Limited based at Whitestone in Hereford HR1 3SE. From 12 November 2021 until further notice, he received an annual fee of £4,000 for an expected time commitment of approximately 10 hrs a year. (This was first registered on 9 September 2013 and updated on subsequent years, most recently on 19 November 2021.

From 21 November 2015, Wiggin was managing director of Emerging Asset Management Ltd, in Hamilton, Bermuda. From 1 September 2016, he was director of two fund platforms in the Cayman Islands, and two in Bermuda.

From 1 January 2019 his remuneration as managing director and Board director is £49,140 a year (£4,095 monthly). Hours were expected to be 8 hrs a week for these two directorships and for his managing director role. (Registered 28 November 2015 and last registered on 8 November 2021)

On 1 February 2021 he received director's fees of £21,942.20 for being a director of four platforms from January to December 2021.

On 26 February 2021 he received a bonus of £3,194.59 in respect of July to December 2020. Hours: no extra hours. (Registered 3 March 2021)

On 27 October 2021 he received a performance related payment of £3,135.44 in respect of 2021 Hours: no extra hours. (Registered 8 November 2021)

From 4 November 2021 until 3 November 2023, he will be adviser to R and D Glass (fertiliser production), in Stourbridge. For providing agricultural advice, he will receive £2,000 per annum, paid annually. Hours: 10 hrs a year. (Registered 8 November 2021)

Wiggin has accepted donations and donations in kind from a number of sources, including the British Association for Shooting and Conservation (two days' shooting and two nights' accommodation in 2011 and 2012 at Catton Hall, Derbyshire; total value £1,527) and one day of shooting with Cubitt Consulting in 2004.

In 2008, Wiggin accepted an expenses-paid trip to Malaysia, by palm oil conglomerate Sime Darby.

Personal life
Wiggin is the son of the late Sir Jerry Wiggin, MP for Weston-super-Mare.

Wiggin lives in Upton Bishop in South Herefordshire, with his wife Milly. She was previously the girlfriend of David Cameron. They have three children.

In addition to acting as a Trustee of the Eveson Charitable Trust, which assigns funding to support medical research and the disadvantaged, Wiggin is patron to several local charities. His interests include motorbikes, DIY, shooting, fishing and Hereford cattle.

Bibliography
 A Better Agenda for the Environment published by Exposure Publishing, an imprint of Diggory Press

References

External links

 Bill Wiggin MP homepage

|-

|-

1966 births
Conservative Party (UK) MPs for English constituencies
Living people
People educated at Eton College
People from Westminster
Politics of Herefordshire
Royal Welch Fusiliers officers
UK MPs 2001–2005
UK MPs 2005–2010
UK MPs 2010–2015
UK MPs 2015–2017
UK MPs 2017–2019
UK MPs 2019–present
Knights Bachelor
Politicians awarded knighthoods